The 1910–11 St. John's Redmen basketball team represented St. John's University during the 1910–11 intercollegiate basketball season in the United States. The head coach was Claude Allen, coaching in his first season with the Redmen. The team finished the season with a 14–0 record and was retroactively named the national champion by the Helms Athletic Foundation and the Premo-Porretta Power Poll.

Schedule and results

|-
!colspan=9 style="background:#FF0000; color:#FFFFFF;"| Regular season

Source

References

St. John's Red Storm men's basketball seasons
NCAA Division I men's basketball tournament championship seasons
St. John's
St. John's Redmen Basketball Team
St. John's Redmen Basketball Team